The Yan District is a district in Kedah, Malaysia. It is bordered by Kota Setar District to the north, Pendang District to the northeast and Kuala Muda District to the south. Yan District is along the coast of the Straits of Malacca. It is the smallest municipality in Kedah.

"Yan Besar" is the administrative town of Yan district, complete with administrative facilities such like Police Stations, magistrate court, district and land office. Its lifestyle is laid-back and slow-paced, with weekend attractions of natural waterfalls nearby. It also attract most pensioners to build their dream house for pleasant retirement or nurture some local fruit orchards. The waterfalls derived from the Jerai Mountain are known as Seri Perigi, Tangga Kenari/Titi Hayun, Batu Hampar  and Puteri Mandi.

It is also famous for Mount Jerai, which is the tallest peak in Kedah at 1242 metres (3,235 ft) and is easily accessible from the town. Visitors can climb by stairs to the peak of Mount Jerai via Titi Hayun.

Pulau Bunting Bridge is a bridge that connects Pulau Bunting to Yan district. It is the only bridge connecting an island in Kedah.

Administrative divisions

Yan is divided into 5 mukims, which are:
Dulang
Sala Besar
Singkir
Sungai Daun
Yan

Demographics

People from Yan
 Abdullah Hussain - novelist and writer.
Abdul Rahman Hashim- deceased Inspector General of Police. 
Alif Rahimi- Grumpy pasemboq yan

Federal Parliament and State Assembly seats

List of Yan district representatives in the Federal Parliament (Dewan Rakyat)

List of Yan district representatives in the State Legislative Assembly (Dewan Undangan Negeri)

References